This is a list of women who have won the Miss Malaya, Miss Malaysia and Miss Universe Malaysia beauty pageant.

Titleholders

1952 to 1963 

Miss Malaysia titleholders from 1949 to 1963 include:

 Miss Malaya
 1949: Joan May Darby, of Kuala Lumpur.
 1951: Collen Cooke, 17, of Kuala Lumpur.
 1952: Zainon Mohammed, 16, of Selangor.
 Miss Max Factor Malaya
 1953: Violet Maria Sleigh, 18, of Singapore.
 Miss Malaya Quest
 1954: Marjorie (Margie) Wee, 21, of Singapore.
 1955: Sharifa Nooli, 18, of Johor Bahru, Johore.
 1956: Ashley Thompson, of Kuala Lumpur.
 1957: Zahra Abdul Latiff, of Kangar, Perlis.
 1958: Norita Hussain, of Langkawi, Kedah.
 1959: Lydia Evelyn Richard, 17, of Muar, Johore.
 1960: Sofea Mahadi Salleh, 19, of Kuantan, Pahang.
 1961: Brenda Maureen Alvisse, 18, of Penang.
 1962: Sarah Al-Habshee Abdullah, 18, of Kuala Lumpur.
 1963: Nik Azizah Nik Yahya, 19, of Kota Bahru, Kelantan.

1964 to present 
From 1964 on, the winner of Miss Universe Malaysia will represent the country at Miss Universe pageant.

List of Runners-up and finalists

1st Runner–Up 
The first runner-up of each edition of Miss Universe Malaysia is the second placer behind the candidate who is crowned as Miss Universe Malaysia (first placer). In some cases, she shall take over the title of Miss Universe. There are some special considerations:

 The outgoing titleholder cannot fulfill her duties as the winner. This could happen and may result to resignation, giving up the title, or dethronement
 The titleholder is dethroned due to deeds that violate the organization's policies. This has only happened in 1969.

2nd Runner–Up 
The second runner-up of each edition of Miss Universe Malaysia is the third placer behind the candidate who is crowned as Miss Universe (first placer) and the first Runner-Up (second placer).

3rd Runner–Up

4th Runner–Up

Trivia 
Miss Universe 1959, Akiko Kojima

Arrived in Kuala Lumpur on Dec 15, 1959 in a series of personal appearances. She waved cheerfully to the crowd waited for her at Subang Airport. Her visit was sponsored by mr K. C. Lee of Max Factor Cosmetic and Mr. Gan Yit Loong of Hong Bee Textile (Malaya) which was the main sponsor for Miss Japan contest and also Shaw Brothers. Her KL visit marked the first time Miss Universe winner ever set foot on Malayan soil.

Miss Universe 1988, Porntip Nakhirunkanok

Attend the Miss Malaysia Universe 1989 contest to witness the winner of the pageant in Kuala Lumpur. She was in Malaysia to grace the pageant and left for home after three-day visit.

Miss Universe 1991, Lupita Jones

Attend the Miss Malaysia Universe 1992 contest to witness the winner of the pageant in Kuala Lumpur.

Miss Universe 1994, Sushmita Sen

With her different American accent and bimbette V-signs at the Miss India 1995 pageant, she could have put off the home crowds. But not so in the last fortnight Kuala Lumpur, Malaysia. In the city where Miss Malaysia Universe was crowned, Sushmita Sen was a vortex of sensation.

Miss Universe 1995, Chelsi Smith

Attend the final of Miss Malaysia Universe 1996 contest to witness the winner of the pageant.

Miss Universe 1996, Alicia Machado

Attend the final of Miss Malaysia Universe 1997 contest to witness the winner of the pageant.

Miss Universe 2000, Lara Dutta

Visited Malaysia to attend the final contest of Miss Malaysia Universe 2000 in Kuala Lumpur.

Miss Universe 2005, Natalie Glebova

Arrived in Kuala Lumpur on March 29, 2005 to be one of the judges for the Miss Malaysia Universe 2005 pageant.

Miss Universe 2017, Demi-Leigh Nel-Peters

Came to Kuala Lumpur for the launch of the MUCA brand facial skin care product which is also one of the sponsor in the Miss Universe 2018 in Bangkok, Thailand. Former Miss Universe Malaysia 2011, Deborah Henry and national director of Miss Universe Malaysia, Elaine Daly were there to accompany Demi-Leigh.

National Directors 

Mr. Jaycee Liu Chang Lan (1962–1980)
Andrea Fonseka (2010–2013)
Carey Ng (2014–2016)
Datin Elaine Daly (2013, 2016–2022)
Datin Wira Poppy Capella Swastika (2023–present)

Franchise Holders 

Rotary Club Kuala Lumpur (1952–1959)
 Junior Chamber of Malaya (1960–1963)
 PJ and Jaycees Kuala Lumpur (1964–1968)
Far East Beauty Congress (1969–1974)
Miss Orient Sdn. Bhd. (1975–1980)
 Pageant Promotions Pte. Ltd. (1981–2008)
Beyond Entity Sdn. Bhd. (2009–2015)
MYEG Services Berhad (2016–2022)
Just Capella Sdn. Bhd. (2023–present)

Name Changes 

 Miss Malaya (1962–1963)
 Miss Malaysia (1964–1969)
 Miss Malaysia Universe (1970–2009)
 Miss Universe Malaysia Organization (2010–2022)
 Miss Universe Malaysia (2023–present)

Host country 
Malaysia was selected by the Miss Universe organization to be the host country twice in Miss Universe 1976 and Miss Universe 1990 but due to the lack of supports from the Malaysian government and the private sector during the year, therefore hampered the efforts of all parties involved to make it a reality. The pageants then changed to a new place which were Hong Kong in 1976 and California, USA in 1990.

Notes

References

External links 

 Miss Universe Malaysia official website

Miss Universe Malaysia